Digital platform may refer to:

Computing platform, the environment in which a piece of software is executed
Web portal, a specially designed website that brings information from diverse sources, like emails, online forums and search engines, together in a uniform way
Digital platform (infrastructure), a software-based online infrastructure that facilitates interactions and transactions between users